This is a list of fellows of the Royal Society elected in 1719.

Fellows
 Charles Bale (1692–1730)
 John Bellers (c. 1654–1725)
 John Busby (fl. 1719)
 James Cavendish (c. 1673–1751)
 John Georges (fl. 1719–1738)
 William Man Godschall (1720–1802)
 William Gould (1715–1799)
 James Hill (1696–1727)
 Johann Georg Keyssler (1693–1743)
 Colin MacLaurin (1698–1746)
 John Meres (d. 1736)
 Isaac Rand (1674–1743)
 Albert Henri de Salengre (1694?–1723)
 Robert Smith (1689–1768)
 George Stanley (d. 1734)
 John Strachey (1671–1743)
 Moses Williams (1686–1742)

References

1719
1719 in science
1719 in England